Year 1333 (MCCCXXXIII) was a common year starting on Friday (link will display the full calendar) of the Julian calendar.

Events 
 January–December 
 May 18 – Siege of Kamakura in Japan: Forces loyal to Emperor Go-Daigo, led by Nitta Yoshisada, enter and destroy the city, breaking the power of the Hōjō clan over the Kamakura shogunate. The Kamakura period ends, and the Kenmu Restoration under Go-Daigo begins.
 June 6 – William Donn de Burgh, 3rd Earl of Ulster, is murdered as part of the Burke Civil War in Ireland.
 June 8 – King Edward III of England seizes the Isle of Man from Scottish control.
 July 7 – The reign of Emperor Kōgon of Japan, first of the Northern Court (Ashikaga) Pretenders, ends.
 July 19 –  Wars of Scottish Independence - Battle of Halidon Hill: Edward III of England decisively defeats Sir Archibald Douglas. Berwick-upon-Tweed returns to English control.
 November 4 – The River Arno floods, causing massive damage in Florence, as recorded by Giovanni Villani.

 Date unknown 
 A famine (lasting until 1337) breaks out in China, killing six million.
 A great famine takes place in Southern Europe. It is known to historians of Catalonia as Lo mal any primer, "the First Bad Year" (equivalent to the Great Famine of 1315–1317 further north), an early notice of the catastrophes of the second half of this century. 
 Jan IV of Dražic, Bishop of Prague, founds a friary and builds a stone bridge at Roudnice in Bohemia.
 The Kapellbrücke wooden bridge over the Reuss in Lucerne (Switzerland) is built; by the 20th century it will be the world's oldest truss bridge and Europe's oldest covered bridge.
 The Venetian historian Marino Sanudo Torsello publishes his History of the realm of Romania (Istoria del regno di Romania), one of the most important sources on the history of Latin Greece.

Births 
 date unknown
 Kan'ami, Japanese noh actor and writer (d. 1384)
 Helena Kantakouzene, empress consort of Byzantium (d. 1396)
 Mikhail II of Tver (d. 1399)
 Peter Parler, German architect (d. 1399)
 Carlo Zeno, Venetian admiral (d. 1418)

Deaths 
 February 7 – Nikko, Japanese priest, founder of Nichiren Shoshu Buddhism (b. 1246)
 March – William of Alnwick, Franciscan friar and theologian
 March 2 – King Wladyslaw I of Poland (b. 1261)
 June 6 – William Donn de Burgh, 3rd Earl of Ulster (b. 1312)
 June 18 – Henry XV, Duke of Bavaria (b. 1312)
 July 19 (at the Battle of Halidon Hill):
 John Campbell, Earl of Atholl
 Alexander Bruce, Earl of Carrick
 Sir Archibald Douglas
 Maol Choluim II, Earl of Lennox
 Kenneth de Moravia, 4th Earl of Sutherland
 July 28 – Guy VIII of Viennois, Dauphin of Vienne (b. 1309)
 November 9 – Empress Saionji Kishi of Japan (b. 1303)
 October 16 – Antipope Nicholas V
 date unknown
 Prince Morikuni, 9th and last shōgun of the Kamakura shogunate in Japan. (b. 1301)
 Nichimoku, Japanese priest, the 3rd high priest of Taisekiji temple and Nichiren Shoshu (b. 1260)

References